We're in This Together is the 1990 studio album by American hip hop duo Low Profile. It was released in 1990 through Priority Records, and it was produced entirely by DJ Aladdin. The album peaked at number 66 on the US Billboard Top R&B/Hip-Hop Albums.

Production
We're in This Together was recorded and mixed at Milagre Sound Recorders in Glendale, California.

Release
We're in This Together was released on January 25, 1990.

Two singles from "We're in This Together" charated "Pay Ya Dues" which peaked at #8 on the Hot Rap Songs, and "Funky Song", which peaked at #87 on the Hot R&B/Hip-Hop Songs. Music videos for both of the singles were directed by actor and director Jon Gries,

Critical reception 

From retrospective reviews, Alex Henderson of Allmusic stated the WC and DJ Aladdin |showed some potential on its first and only album" declaring the album "decent if uneven" specifically praising "How Ya Livin'" and "That's Why They Do It" as "riveting" while "Pay Ya Dues" made "a meaningful statement about rappers who get ahead without paying dues, but is marred by a homophobic reference."

Track listing

Personnel 
Credits adapted from the album's liner notes.
 DJ Aladdin – producer
 Doug Young – executive producer
 Guy Manganiello – A&R direction
 Kevin Hosmann – art direction
 Dennis Keeley – photography

Chart history 
Album

References

External links 
We're in This Together at Discogs
We're in This Together at MusicBrainz
We're in This Together at Tower Records

1990 debut albums
WC (rapper) albums
Priority Records albums
Albums produced by DJ Aladdin